Marlene Sidaway (born 1937) is a British television, film and theatre actress best known for playing Brenda Taylor in the long-running soap opera Coronation Street.

Early life 
Sidaway was born in Thornaby-on-Tees, North Yorkshire. On leaving school, she trained as an adding-machine operator, and, in 1961, she was accepted into the East 15 Acting School in London. Sidaway's first job was with Brian Way's Theatre Centre in London, touring schools across the country. She spent several years in repertory theatre, before settling in Manchester and starting to work in radio and television.

Theatre roles
In February 2013, Sidaway played the role of Mrs Purdy, in D.H. Lawrence's The Daughter-in-Law, at the Crucible Theatre, Sheffield, South Yorkshire. In September 2015, she played the role of Mrs Wilberforce in The Ladykillers, at the Watermill Theatre, Bagnor, Newbury, Berkshire. In February 2018, Sidaway played the role of Miriam in Ghassan Kanafani's Returning to Haifa, at the Finborough Theatre, West Brompton, London. Later that year, in June, she played the role of Doris in Alan Bennett's A Cream Cracker under the Settee in people's homes, in every postcode area across the City of Leeds, and at the West Yorkshire Playhouse. The following year, in May 2019, Sidaway played Flora Parkin in Beneath the Blue Rinse at the Park Theatre, Finsbury Park, London.

Television roles
Sidaway has been a familiar character actor since the 1970s, notably playing Brenda Taylor in the ITV soap opera Coronation Street between June 1990 and November 1992. She had previously appeared in the soap twice with cameo roles in 1976, as Mrs Briscoe, and again in 1982 as Mrs Fletcher. In 1995, Sidaway played Hill the housekeeper in the BBC adaption of Pride and Prejudice in 1995, and the court usher Dee Yearwood in the BBC courtroom drama Accused in 1996.

Sidaway has appeared in four episodes of the ITV detective series Midsomer Murders; The Killings at Badger's Drift as Counsellor 2 in 1997, Written in Blood as Mrs Bundy in 1998, Death's Shadow as Mrs Bundy again in 1999 and Judgement Day as Mrs Foster in 2000.

In 1999, Sidaway played as Marge Beake in a one off ITV drama, Hunting Venus, the mother of Charlotte (formally known as Charlie) after Simon Delancey, played by Martin Clunes, enquirers on the whereabouts of Charlotte. In 2001, she was cast as Mrs Dorothy Barker in the ITV prison drama Bad Girls. Between 2016 and 2019, Sidaway played Maureen in the BBC sitcom Mum.

Sidaway's other television roles include parts in Lovejoy, Casualty, Doctors, Holby City, Heartbeat, Andy Robson, Miss Marple, All Creatures Great and Small, Jeeves and Wooster, The Bill, The Vicar of Dibley, Foyle's War, The Inspector Lynley Mysteries, Doc Martin, Survivors, and Being Human.

Film roles
Sidaway's film appearances include roles in Me and Orson Welles, Beautiful Thing, I Want Candy, Goodnight Mister Tom, Blackball, Tom's Midnight Garden, Ready When You Are Mr. McGill, Silence Is Golden, All Men Are Mortal, The Magic Toyshop and The Quiz Kid. She played the role of Jean in the 2018 film Sink.

Personal life
Sidaway was Secretary of the International Brigade Memorial Trust, before becoming President, succeeding Jack Jones upon his death. The Trust commemorates the volunteers who enlisted to fight Fascism in the Spanish Civil War. She has lived in Stratford, in the London Borough of Newham, since 1983, after living in Manchester for seven years. Her hobbies include her daily walk to West Ham Park.

Sidaway lived with her partner, David Marshall, from 1990 until his death in 2005. Marshall fought in the Spanish Civil War and had also been a member of the Brigade.

Filmography

References

External links

Living people
1937 births
Alumni of East 15 Acting School
English film actresses
English television actresses
People from Thornaby-on-Tees
Actresses from Yorkshire